"Floorfiller" is a song by Swedish pop group A-Teens. It was released on 15 July 2002 in the United States as the second single from their third studio album, Pop 'til You Drop! It was later released on 14 October 2002 in Europe as the first single from the group's fourth (and final) studio album, New Arrival. The track was written by Grizzly, Tysper and Mack, who had previously worked with the group on several songs on their second studio album, Teen Spirit, including "Upside Down" and "Halfway Around the World".

Music video
The Sanaa Hamri directed video was filmed at the Loft, a club in Los Angeles. The A-Teens participated in the creation of the concept for the video. The video was choreographed by Charles Klapow, who would later be the choreographer for the 2006 Disney Channel Original Movie High School Musical.

Track listing

Charts

Weekly charts

Year-end charts

Certifications

References

2002 singles
2002 songs
A-Teens songs
MCA Records singles
Music videos directed by Sanaa Hamri
Songs written by Tommy Tysper
Stockholm Records singles